Nurul Islam Milon is a Bangladeshi politician and the former Member of Parliament from Comilla-8.

Early life
Milon was born on 20 July 1949. He did his undergraduate, graduate degree, and PhD in physics at the University of Dhaka.

Career
Milon was elected to Parliament from Comilla-8 as a Jatiya Party candidate in 2014 and ended his term in 2018.

Milon lost the re-election from Comilla-8 as a Jatiya Party candidate on 30 December 2018 to Nasimul Alam Chowdhury of Awami League. He had received 1,411 votes and came a distant third while Chowdhury received 188,659 votes.

References

Living people
10th Jatiya Sangsad members
1949 births
Jatiya Party politicians
University of Dhaka alumni